Denis Sergeyevich Pimankov (born 4 February 1975 in Omsk) is a freestyle swimmer from Russia, who won several medals as a member of the freestyle relay team (4×100 m and 4×200 m) during the late 1990s and early 2000s. He competed in three consecutive Summer Olympics for Russia, starting in 1996.

External links
 Profile on FINA website
 

1975 births
Living people
Russian male swimmers
Swimmers at the 1996 Summer Olympics
Swimmers at the 2000 Summer Olympics
Swimmers at the 2004 Summer Olympics
Olympic swimmers of Russia
Olympic silver medalists for Russia
Sportspeople from Omsk
Russian male freestyle swimmers
World Aquatics Championships medalists in swimming
Medalists at the FINA World Swimming Championships (25 m)
European Aquatics Championships medalists in swimming
Medalists at the 1996 Summer Olympics
Olympic silver medalists in swimming
Universiade medalists in swimming
Goodwill Games medalists in swimming
Universiade gold medalists for Russia
Medalists at the 1999 Summer Universiade
Competitors at the 1998 Goodwill Games